Dylan's Candy Bar is a chain of boutique candy shops and candy supplier currently located in New York City; East Hampton, New York; Los Angeles, Chicago, Honolulu and The Bahamas, as well as several US airports and in wholesale venues around the globe. It is owned by Dylan Lauren.

History
Lauren was inspired to create the store, which is asserted to be the "largest unique candy store in the world", by the Roald Dahl story of Willy Wonka & the Chocolate Factory. Lauren said that her goal was to "merge fashion, art and pop candy culture". It stocks 7,000 candies from around the world. The design and image were produced by original Creative Director Mayumi Ando. Dylan's Candy Bar has also partnered with Holt Renfrew in Vancouver, British Columbia in a co-branding effort. The flagship store has supposedly become something of a "required stop" for those visiting New York, and celebrities such as Mary-Kate and Ashley Olsen, Katie Holmes and her daughter, Suri Cruise, Janet Jackson, and Madonna reportedly make a point to visit the store.

The New York City store, located on 60th Street and 3rd Avenue, is the flagship store. It has become a location for several television shows and movies based in New York.

Founder Dylan Lauren was featured on the cover of the May 2011 Forbes magazine for inheriting her father's entrepreneurial genes.  In October 2011 Dylan's Candy Bar celebrated its 10th anniversary.

Appearances in media

Hitch
Dylan's Candy Bar was featured in Hitch, a 2005 romantic comedy starring Will Smith, Eva Mendes, and Kevin James. In the opening scene when Hitch, played by Will Smith, explains basic principles on how to get the girl, one of the characters becomes attracted to a saleswoman at Dylan's Candy Bar, but fails to grab her attention at the store.

Arthur
In the movie Arthur, Arthur (Russell Brand) gets a job at the store to prove to his mother he can be an adult on his own.  After being hired by the manager (John Hodgman), he holds three positions; cashier, stock, and sales floor.  He buys his way into a gummy bear costume from Scott Adsit's character.  This job ends in Arthur falling down the stairs and being fired from the short-lived job.

Gossip Girl
Season 2, Episode 15:, "Gone with the Will", Vanessa (Jessica Szohr) and Dan (Penn Badgley) shop for a thoughtful anniversary gift for Nate in Dylan's Candy Bar while Dan tries revealing to Vanessa that his father and his girlfriend Serena's (Blake Lively) mother may have a love child. They were rudely interrupted by preteen Gossip Girl followers trying to pin an affair on Dan and make for an escape out of the store.
Season 3, Episode 7: "How to Succeed in Bassness" Rufus Humphrey (Matthew Settle) is prepared for trick-or-treaters with his Dylan's Candy Bar bag at his wife's Lily (Kelly Rutherford) Upper East Side apartment.

Project Runway
Season 10, Episode 2:, "Candy Couture", Designers compete in an unconventional challenge where designs are constructed of only products purchased from Dylan's Candy Bar.  Each designer was given $250 to purchase products, but all products were 50% off, allowing designers to purchase $500 worth of product from the store.

Cake Boss
Season 2, Episode 2:, "Candy, Crash and Crisis", the New York candy store orders a cake adorned with its products.

It was also in its spinoff show, "Next Great Baker" where the season 4 contestants had to make a candy themed cake.

Dinner: Impossible
Season 7, Episode 2:, "List of Dinner: Impossible episodes", Dylan has Robert Irvine prepare a party for 250 guests in just 8 hours with candy from the store in every dish.  In addition, she has him make a cake that utilizes candy from the store but is made out of Rice Krispies Treats.

Unbreakable Kimmy Schmidt
In the pilot episode, titular character Kimmy Schmidt visits Dylan's Candy Bar as an expression of her newfound freedom. While shopping at the store, she exclaims "I'm having candy for dinner!" She later revisits Dylan's Candy Bar to try to get a job working there, telling an employee that she is "a big fan of your products, particularly the shark gummies," which she "hadn't seen anywhere else."

References

External links 
Official Website

Confectionery companies of the United States
Companies based in New York City
Shops in New York City
Lauren family
Commercial buildings in Manhattan
Confectionery stores